Matero is a township in the north-western part of the city of Lusaka in Zambia.

Location
The neighborhood is bordered to the northeast by the T2 road (Great North Road), that stretches between Kabwe to the north, through Lusaka to Kafue to the south. To the southeast, the border is Lumumba Road. Umuzilikazi Road marks the neighborhood's southern border. The western border is the river that starts near the southern end of Chitanda Road and flows northwestwards until it crosses the same street near the Chitanda Sewerage pond. The northern border of Matero stretches from the Chitanda pond to the west, through Chitanda Cemetery, to end at the T2 highway, immediately north of National Heroes Stadium. The coordinates of Matero are: 15°22'33.0"S, 28°15'47.0"E (Latitude:-15.375823; Longitude:28.263054).

Overview
Matero, Lusaka is a high-density, working class neighborhood. It used to be  known for criminal activities, bad road networks and poor drainage system. Currently the area has recorded a number of developments such as new roads, drainage and other infrastructure developments compared to what the area used to be.

See also
 Lusaka
 List of banks in Zambia

References

External links 
Website of Lusaka City Council

Neighborhoods of Lusaka